Caryl Lincoln (November 16, 1903 – February 20, 1983) was an American film actress whose career spanned from 1927 to 1964.

Biography
The Oakland, California-born Lincoln started her acting career in silent films. In 1927, she signed a long-term contract with Fox Film studios. Her first film was Slippery Silks in 1927. She starred in ten films from 1927 to the end of 1928 and was selected as a WAMPAS Baby Star in 1929. In 1930 she starred opposite Bob Steele in The Land of Missing Men, which started her on a path to several heroine roles in western films. One of her best known roles during this period was opposite Tom Tyler in War on the Range (1933).

Her career had slowed by 1934, however, and her last credited role was that same year, in Charlie Chan's Courage. She was a friend (and future sister-in-law) of actress Barbara Stanwyck, through whom she met Stanwyck's brother, Byron Stevens. She and Stevens married in 1934, and remained together until his death in 1964. She never remarried. They had one son, Brian.

When she tired of the effort needed to be a star in films, Lincoln chose to work as a bit player and extra rather than leave the profession.

Her acting career took a backseat to her marriage and family, with her having few roles from 1934 to 1964, all uncredited. She retired in 1964 and never returned to acting. She died on February 20, 1983, in the Woodland Hills area of Los Angeles, California.

Filmography

References

External links

B-movie heroines, Caryl Lincoln

1903 births
1983 deaths
20th-century American actresses
American film actresses
American silent film actresses
Actresses from Oakland, California
WAMPAS Baby Stars
Western (genre) film actresses